Brunei competed at the 2022 World Games held in Birmingham, United States from 7 to 17 July 2022. Athletes representing Brunei won one gold medal and one silver medal. The country finished in 42nd place in the medal table.

Medalists

Invitational sports

Competitors
The following is the list of number of competitors in the Games.

Wushu

Brunei won two medals in wushu.

References

Nations at the 2022 World Games
World Games
World Games